Euler's factorization method is a technique for factoring a number by writing it as a sum of two squares in two different ways.

The idea that two distinct representations of an odd positive integer may lead to a factorization was apparently first proposed by Marin Mersenne. However, it was not put to use extensively until one hundred years later by Euler. His most celebrated use of the method that now bears his name was to factor the number , which apparently was previously thought to be prime even though it is not a pseudoprime by any major primality test.

Euler's factorization method is more effective than Fermat's for integers whose factors are not close together and potentially much more efficient than trial division if one can find representations of numbers as sums of two squares reasonably easily. Euler's development ultimately permitted much more efficient factoring of numbers and, by the 1910s, the development of large factor tables going up to about ten million. The methods used to find representations of numbers as sums of two squares are essentially the same as with finding differences of squares in Fermat's factorization method.

Disadvantage and Limitation 
The great disadvantage of Euler's factorization method is that it cannot be applied to factoring an integer with any prime factor of the form 4k + 3 occurring to an odd power in its prime factorization, as such a number can never be the sum of two squares. Even odd composite numbers of the form 4k + 1 are often the product of two primes of the form 4k + 3 (e.g. 3053 = 43 × 71) and again cannot be factored by Euler's method.

This restricted applicability has made Euler's factorization method disfavoured for computer factoring algorithms, since any user attempting to factor a random integer is unlikely to know whether Euler's method can actually be applied to the integer in question. It is only relatively recently that there have been attempts to develop Euler's method into computer algorithms for use on specialised numbers where it is known Euler's method can be applied.

Theoretical basis

The Brahmagupta–Fibonacci identity states that the product of two sums of two squares is a sum of two squares. Euler's method relies on this theorem but it can be viewed as the converse, given  we find  as a product of sums of two squares.

First deduce that

and factor both sides to get

 (1)

Now let  and  so that there exists some constants  satisfying

 , 
 ,

 ,
 ,

Substituting these into equation (1) gives

Canceling common factors yields

 
 

So

 
 
 
 

We now see that  and 

Applying the Brahmagupta–Fibonacci identity we get

Without loss of generality, assume that pair  is even. The factorization then becomes

Worked example

Since: 

we have from the formula above:

Thus,

Pseudocode 
 function Euler_factorize(int n) -> list[int]
    if is_prime(n) then
        print("Number is not factorable")
        exit function
    for-loop from a=1 to a=ceiling(sqrt(n))
        b2 = n - a*a
        b = floor(sqrt(b2))
        if b*b==b2
            break loop preserving a,b
    if a*a+b*b!=n then
        print("Failed to find any expression for n as sum of squares")
        exit function
    for-loop from c=a+1 to c=ceiling(sqrt(n))
        d2 = n - c*c
        d = floor(sqrt(d2))
        if d*d==d2 then
            break loop preserving c,d
    if c*c+d*d!=n then
        print("Failed to find a second expression for n as sum of squares")
        exit function
    A = c-a, B = c+a
    C = b-d, D = b+d 
    k = GCD(A,C)//2, h = GCD(B,D)//2
    l = GCD(A,D)//2, m = GCD(B,C)//2
    factor1 = k*k + h*h
    factor2 = l*l + m*m
    return list[ factor1, factor2 ]

References
 
 

Euler's factorization method